Greenvale is a hamlet and census-designated place (CDP) in the towns of North Hempstead and Oyster Bay in Nassau County, on the North Shore of Long Island, in New York, United States. It is considered part of the Greater Roslyn area, which is anchored by the Incorporated Village of Roslyn. The population was 1,904 at the 2010 census.

History
Located between Roslyn and Brookville, the Greenvale LIRR station is known as the Long Island Rail Road stop for the C.W. Post Campus of Long Island University and the New York Institute of Technology. While LIU Post is located to the east in Brookville, it uses the Greenvale postal code (11548). Until 1866, the community was originally known as "Cedar Swamp", and later known as "Bull's Head", until some point in the early 20th century.

While many residential areas in the hamlet were developed prior to the Second World War, the 1940s and 1950s saw the development of the area adjacent to the Roslyn Cemetery and the Long Island Rail Road tracks (including Park Avenue and Wellington Road).

Geography 

Greenvale is located within the Hempstead Harbor Watershed, which itself is located within the larger Long Island Sound/Atlantic Ocean Watershed.

Greenvale is located mainly within the Town of North Hempstead, while a small portion is located in the Town of Oyster Bay.

Demographics

As of the census of 2000, there were 2,231 people, 362 households, and 254 families residing in the CDP. The population density was 8,674.4 per square mile (3,313.1/km2). There were 372 housing units at an average density of 1,446.4/sq mi (552.4/km2). The racial makeup of the CDP was 66.11% White, 12.73% African American, 0.36% Native American, 10.49% Asian, 0.13% Pacific Islander, 7.08% from other races, and 3.09% from two or more races. Hispanic or Latino of any race were 13.09% of the population.

There were 362 households, out of which 32.6% had children under the age of 18 living with them, 58.8% were married couples living together, 8.6% had a female householder with no husband present, and 29.8% were non-families. 24.6% of all households were made up of individuals, and 10.5% had someone living alone who was 65 years of age or older. The average household size was 2.73 and the average family size was 3.22.

In the CDP, the population was spread out, with 10.0% under the age of 18, 55.4% from 18 to 24, 16.8% from 25 to 44, 11.7% from 45 to 64, and 6.1% who were 65 years of age or older. The median age was 22 years. For every 100 females, there were 79.9 males. For every 100 females age 18 and over, there were 77.1 males.

The median income for a household in the CDP was $59,500, and the median income for a family was $80,292. Males had a median income of $52,639 versus $30,000 for females. The per capita income for the CDP was $22,009. About 4.3% of families and 4.4% of the population were below the poverty line, including none of those under the age of eighteen or sixty-five or over.

Government 
As Greenvale is an unincorporated part of the towns of North Hempstead and Oyster Bay, it is directly governed by the two towns; the parts of the hamlet within the Town of North Hempstead are governed directly by the Town of North Hempstead's government in Manhasset, while the parts of the hamlet in the Town of Oyster Bay are governed directly by the Town of Oyster Bay's government in Oyster Bay.

As of March 2022, the parts of Greenvale located within the Town of North Hempstead are represented on the Town Board by Peter J. Zuckerman (D-East Hills), and is located in its 2nd Council District.

Education

School districts 
Greenvale is split between the Roslyn Union Free School District and North Shore Central School District. Students who reside in Greenvale and attend in public school will attend one of these two districts depending on where they live in the hamlet.

Most of the hamlet is within the Roslyn School District; the school district boundary between Roslyn and North Shore within the hamlet corresponds with the North Hempstead-Oyster Bay town line.

Library districts 
Greenvale is served by Roslyn's library district and by the Gold Coast Library District. The boundaries of the library districts correspond with the school district boundaries; Roslyn's library district (the Bryant Library) serves the parts of Greenvale in the Roslyn Union Free School District and the Gold Coast Library District serves the parts of Greenvale in the North Shore Central School District.

Landmarks 
Greenvale is the site of the historic Roslyn East Gate Toll House, a former toll house for the former North Hempstead Turnpike, which has been listed on the National Register of Historic Places since August 16, 1977.

As aforementioned, the historic Roslyn Cemetery is also located within the hamlet, and is also listed on the National Register of Historic Places.

References

Town of North Hempstead, New York
Oyster Bay (town), New York
Census-designated places in New York (state)
Hamlets in New York (state)
Census-designated places in Nassau County, New York
Hamlets in Nassau County, New York